The Gray Spring Recreation Area is a picnic area with scenic views in the Ozark-St. Francis National Forest of northwestern Arkansas.  It is located on northern Franklin County, on Forest Road 1003, and includes a picnic shelter, comfort facilities, an outdoor barbecue pit, and picnic tables.  The picnic area and Forest Road 1003 were built in 1934 by a crew from the Civilian Conservation Corps, and were listed on the National Register of Historic Places in 1995.  The road, which winds precariously around Black Mountain, retains a number of surviving CCC-built features, including a bridge and many stone culverts.

See also
National Register of Historic Places listings in Franklin County, Arkansas

References

Buildings and structures completed in 1934
Buildings and structures in Franklin County, Arkansas
Ozark–St. Francis National Forest
Civilian Conservation Corps in Arkansas
Historic districts on the National Register of Historic Places in Arkansas
National Register of Historic Places in Franklin County, Arkansas
1934 establishments in Arkansas